The Broxbourne Council election, 1994 was held to elect council members of the Broxbourne Borough Council, the local government authority of the borough of Broxbourne, Hertfordshire, England.

Composition of expiring seats before election

Election results

Results summary 
An election was held in 14 wards on 5 May 1994.

15 seats were contested at this election (2 seats in Hoddesdon North Ward).

The Conservative Party lost 3 seats at this election, Cheshunt Central & Hoddesdon Town to the Liberal Democrats and Theobalds to the Labour Party.

The new political balance of the council following this election was:

Conservative 33 seats
Labour 5 seats
Liberal Democrats 4 Seats

Ward results

References

1994
1994 English local elections
1990s in Hertfordshire